Synergy Inc., which went by the trade name Synergy Geometry Co., Ltd., was a Japanese video game developer and publisher headquartered in Shinjuku-ku, Tokyo. The company is best known for its point-and-click adventure games, which employed pre-rendered 3D computer graphics, including Alice: An Interactive Museum (1991) and Gadget - Invention, Travel, & Adventure (1993), both of which were designed by Haruhiko Shono.

The company also had an American branch named Synergy Interactive Co., based in San Mateo, California, which focused on video game localization, publishing and marketing for western audiences.

List of games

Cancelled projects

Underworld: The Sands of Time

Underworld: The Sands of Time, originally announced under the tentative title of The Underground, was a point-and-click interactive movie directed by Haruhiko Shono, following the development of Gadget: Past as Future. A roughly 5 minute sneak peek for the game was included in Preview & Reprise, an interactive CD-ROM released on November 27, 1997.

Woodcutters from Fiery Ships
Woodcutters from Fiery Ships was announced in early 1998 as a collaboration between Synergy Inc. and David Lynch's interactive company SubStation, with a tentative release window of Fall 1999. In the press release, Lynch said: "I saw the work that Synergy did on Gadget – the way that the game delivered an immersive experience to the user. By collaborating with Synergy, I look forward to Woodcutters From Fiery Ships expanding existing forms in terms of story, characters and environment. I hope we will give people totally unexpected experiences."

In a November 1999 interview with The Guardian, stated that the project was "blocked from the get-go", as it was going to be "completely boring to game buffs".

Notes

References 

Video game companies of Japan
Video game development companies
Video game publishers
Video game companies established in 1986
Japanese companies established in 1986